The Opponent (also known as Uppercut Man) is a 1988 Italian sport  comedy-drama film  directed  by Sergio Martino and starring Daniel Greene, Giuliano Gemma and Ernest Borgnine.

Plot

Cast

Daniel Greene as Bobby Mulligan
Giuliano Gemma as Martin Duranti
Ernest Borgnine as Victor
Keely Shaye Smith as  Anne
Mary Stavin as Gilda Duranti
 Bill Wohrman as Larry
James Warring as  Eddy
A. J. Duhe as Baby
 Herb Goldstein as  Doctor 
 Ruben Rabasa as  Ollie 
Lenny Moore as  Duncan
 Scotty Gallin as  Pappy 
 Mark McCraken as  Don

References

External links

Italian boxing films
1980s English-language films
English-language Italian films
1980s sports comedy films
1988 comedy films
1988 films
1980s Italian films